Poundgate is a hamlet in East Sussex on the A26 Uckfield Road at the junction with Chillies Road, just south of Crowborough. It has one pub, the Crow and Gate, on the main road and a scattering of mainly detached houses.

The name was first recorded in 1564, and is derived from a gate into Ashdown Forest, which Poundgate lies at the south-eastern edge of. The hamlet is in the civil parish of Buxted, for which its population was accounted for in the 2011 census.

Bus services connect to Crowborough and Brighton. The Vanguard Way path goes through the hamlet.

References

Hamlets in East Sussex
Buxted